Sonja Stolić (Serbian Cyrillic: Соња Столић, born April 21, 1980 in Kosovo Polje, SFR Yugoslavia) is a Serbian middle distance and long-distance runner. She competed at the 2000 Summer Olympics in 5000m. Her coach is Desimir Gajić. Her former clubs is Mokra gora - Zubin Potok and Red Star Belgrade.

References
IAAF profile
sports references

1980 births
Living people
People from Kosovo Polje
Kosovo Serbs
Serbian female middle-distance runners
Serbian female long-distance runners
Olympic athletes of Yugoslavia
Athletes (track and field) at the 2000 Summer Olympics
Mediterranean Games silver medalists for Serbia
Athletes (track and field) at the 2005 Mediterranean Games
Mediterranean Games medalists in athletics